Skid Marks is a 2007 independent comedy film about two rival ambulance companies and their attempts to maintain themselves in their city, directed by Karl Kozak and written by Kozak, Don J. Rearden and Kraig Wenman. The film had its theatrical premiere on October 5, 2007, in San Diego, and in 2008, screened at the Dances With Films Festival in Los Angeles.

Premise
Budget cuts force two rival ambulance companies and their misfit medics to go head-to-head to save their patients, their jobs and their beer money, all in the name of emergency medicine.

Cast
 Tyler Poelle as Rich 
 Mikey Post as Louis "One Foot" Jones 
 Scott Dittman as Karl / The Human Stain 
 Les Jennings as T-Bone 
 Kathy Uyen as Lai Mei 
 James Piper as Bob "The Brain" (as Tim Piper) 
 David Schultz as Neil 
 Dianna Agron as Megan 
 Chuck Kelley as Sarge 
 Larrs Jackson as Captain Limison 
 J.R. Nutt as Leonard 
 Matthew Wolf as Jacques

Production
Filming took place over a six-week period during June and July 2006 at locations in San Diego, California, in areas including Kearny Mesa, Point Loma, Hillcrest, uptown San Diego and several beach areas.

Reception
Scott Rosenberg previewed the film in Monsters & Critics. Upon release, the San Diego Union-Tribune wrote that the film's world premiere in San Diego "packed a full house."

North County Times wrote that the film looks to "place itself somewhere near the company of such comic legacies as Animal House and Caddyshack," but offered that such may not happen as fans of such films "rarely allow comparisons." The review noted that the film was directed with "visual flair and good instincts," and performed "with an admirable lack of humility."

In commenting on the home video release of Skid Marks, DVD Verdict called the film a "cheap-'n'-cheesy low-ball, gross-out comedy", and wrote that the two rival companies names, Bayside Ambulatory Life Services and Downtown Intensive Care create acronyms that clue viewers to the general tone of the film and most of its humor.  They felt that it was an unremarkable indie film that was "frequently funny" but more often "frequently stupid," seeming to be aimed at a junior high school audience.  They offered that the DVD release was decent and its image "reasonably good given the $1.98-style budget", and that "the producers don't try to obviously fake things to make it all look higher level than it is."

References

External links
 Skid Marks at the Internet Movie Database

2007 films
2007 comedy films
2007 independent films
2000s English-language films
2000s satirical films
2000s screwball comedy films
2000s sex comedy films
American independent films
American satirical films
American screwball comedy films
American sex comedy films
Films scored by Larry Groupé
Films shot in San Diego
2000s American films